Isovoacristine is a anticholinergic and antihistaminic alkaloid.

See also 
Benztropine
Benzydamine
Chlorpheniramine

References 

Indole alkaloids
Heterocyclic compounds with 5 rings
Methyl esters
Methoxy compounds
Azepanes